Carl Gerlach may refer to:

 Carl R. Gerlach, mayor of Overland Park, Kansas
 Carl Ludvig Gerlach (1832–1893), Danish composer and opera singer
 Carl Gotthelf Gerlach (1704–1761), German organist